Fernando Pastoriza (born 1 February 1965) is an Argentine athlete. He competed in the men's high jump at the 1988 Summer Olympics.

References

1965 births
Living people
Athletes (track and field) at the 1983 Pan American Games
Athletes (track and field) at the 1987 Pan American Games
Pan American Games competitors for Argentina
Athletes (track and field) at the 1988 Summer Olympics
Argentine male high jumpers
Olympic athletes of Argentina
Place of birth missing (living people)
South American Games gold medalists for Argentina
South American Games medalists in athletics
Competitors at the 1982 Southern Cross Games